As a nickname, The Flying Dutchman may refer to:

 Johan Cruyff (1947-2016), Dutch footballer
 Herman Everhardus (1912–1980), American college football player
 Anthony Fokker (1890–1939), Dutch aircraft designer
 Dan Gadzuric (born 1978), Dutch basketball player
 Jurgen van den Goorbergh (born 1969), Dutch motorcycle road racer
 Paul Vander Haar (born 1958), former Australian rules footballer
 Benjamin Hafner (1821–1899), American train driver
 Pieter van den Hoogenband (born 1978), Dutch former swimmer and triple Olympic champion
 Fred Imhoff (born 1942), Dutch sailor
 Johnny Kitzmiller (1904–1986), American college football player, member of the College Football Hall of Fame
 Charles Kurtsinger (1906–1946), American Hall of Fame jockey
 Herman Long (baseball) (1866–1909), American baseball player
 Arie Luyendyk (born 1953), Dutch auto racing driver
 William Moore (steamship captain) (1822–1909), steamship captain, businessman, miner and explorer in British Columbia and Alaska
 Tom Okker (born 1944), Dutch tennis player
 Robin van Persie (born 1983), Dutch footballer
 Arjen Robben (born 1984), Dutch footballer
 Conny van Rietschoten (1926–2013), Dutch yacht skipper
 Roland Scholten (born 1965), Dutch former darts player
 Robin Smeulders (born 1987), German basketball player
 Dick Van Arsdale (born 1943), American National Basketball Association executive and former player and coach
 Honus Wagner (1874–1955), American baseball player
 Robert de Wilde (born 1977), Dutch bicycle motocross (BMX) rider
 Epke Zonderland (born 1986), Dutch gymnast

See also 

Lists of people by nickname
Nicknames in association football
Nicknames in baseball
Nicknames in basketball
Nicknames in sports